Svitanok is a village (a selo) in the Zaporizhzhia Raion (district) of Zaporizhzhia Oblast in southern Ukraine. Its population was 268 in the 2001 Ukrainian Census. Administratively, it belongs to the Avhustynivka Rural Council, a local government area.

References

Populated places established in 1932
Populated places established in the Ukrainian Soviet Socialist Republic

Zaporizhzhia Raion
Villages in Zaporizhzhia Raion